Elections were held in the organized municipalities in the Kenora District of Ontario on October 22, 2018 in conjunction with municipal elections across the province.

Dryden

Source:

Ear Falls

Source:

Ignace

Source:

Kenora

Source:

Machin

Source:

Pickle Lake

Red Lake

Source:

Sioux Lookout

Source:

Sioux Narrows-Nestor Falls

References

Kenora
Kenora District